Florina Ilis (born 1968) is a contemporary Romanian writer who has published haiku volumes and novels. As of March 2005 she is part of the Writers' Union of Romania.

Works 
 Haiku și caligrame (2000)
 Coborârea de pe cruce (2001)
 Chemarea lui Matei (2002)
 Cruciada copiilor (2005)
 Cinci nori colorați pe cerul de răsărit(2006)
 Lecția de aritmetică (Editura Echinox, 2006)
 Fenomenul science fiction în cultura postmodernă. Ficțiunea cyberpunk (Editura Argonaut, 2005)
 Viețile paralele, roman, București, Cartea Românească, 2012

1968 births
Romanian women novelists
Living people